Innerland comprises the debut solo recordings by Mark Peters. Initially released in December 2017 (on limited edition cassette and packaged as a replica mini Ordnance Survey Landranger, with outer slipcase and an imaginary map) it was given a comprehensive (Vinyl/Cd/digital) release with two extra tracks ‘May Mill’ and ‘Gabriel’s Ladder’ in April 2018, as well as a limited edition version with a bonus disc entitled Ambient Innerland, which includes reworked versions of the full extended album. The songs on the album are inspired by memories of places near where Peters grew up.

Track listing

Personnel

Musicians
 Mark Peters: Guitar, piano, synth, programming.
 Craig Sergeant: Harmonica on 3.
 Matthew Linley: Drums on 4 and 8.

Producers
 Written, produced and mixed by Mark Peters.

Other personnel

 Design by Marc Jones.

References

External links
8 Tracks: Of Atmospheric Instrumental Exploration With Mark Peters
Dansette: Mark Peters
Mark Peters: a guide to the geography of Innerland
Echoes Podcast: Engineers Mark Peters - Interview Podcast – Echoes
The 13th Uncut new music playlist of 2018
ICYMI: Mark Peters (Engineers / Ulrich Schnauss) released solo debut ‘Innerland’ - BrooklynVegan

2017 debut albums
Mark Peters (musician) albums